Hughenden may refer to:
Hughenden, Queensland, a town in Australia
Hughenden, Alberta, a village in central Alberta, Canada
Hughenden Valley, a village in Buckinghamshire, England
Hughenden Manor, a mansion in High Wycombe, Buckinghamshire, England, home of Benjamin Disraeli
Hughenden, Glasgow, a rugby stadium in Glasgow and former home of the Glasgow Warriors